Regina Vater is a Brazilian-born American visual artist best known for her installation artwork inspired by Brazilian and African-Brazilian mythologies. In the 1960s, she designed the first album cover for the Tropicália movement, a Brazilian art movement associated with the Brazilian musicians Caetano Veloso and Gilberto Gil. In 1970, she had her first installation, "Magi(o)cean". She has conducted numerous interviews with John Cage, including a video interview that eventually became a part of her film Controverse. She moved to New York in the 1970s, and in 1979 she curated "the first and most comprehensive Brazilian avant-garde exhibit in the city at that time." In 1980, she was awarded a Guggenheim Fellowship. She lived in Austin, Texas with her husband, video installation artist and professor Bill Lundberg, until 2011, when they both moved to Rio de Janeiro, Brazil. Vater's work is known for its feminist themes and questions regarding culture and identity.

Exhibitions

Group exhibitions 

 Biennale des Jeunes, Paris, France (1967) 
 Venice Biennale, Venice, Italy (1976)
 São Paulo Biennial, Brazil (1969, 1976) 
 Texas Triennial (1988)
 P.S.1 Museum, New York, US (1989)
 Transcontinental: Nine Latin American Artists, Birmingham, England (1990)
 Koninklijk National Royal Museum, Antwerp, The Netherlands (1992)
 Brazilian Visual Poetry, Mexic-Arte Museum, Austin, US (2002)

Permanent collections
(Source: Artspace)
 National Library of France, Paris, France
 The Museum of Modern Art of Rio de Janeiro, Rio de Janeiro, Brazil
 The Museum of Modern Art of São Paulo, São Paulo, Brazil
 The Nelson A. Rockefeller Center for Latin American Art, San Antonio, Texas
 The Blanton Museum of the University of Texas, Austin, Texas
 The Ruth and Marvin Sackner Visual Poetry Archives, Miami, Florida

References

External links
Profile on Artspace
interview (English) by Regina Célia Pinto
2004 interview by Cary Cordova for the Archives of American Art, in her home in Austin
Regina Vater Papers, 1967–2009
"El Jardin" video
"A Árvore de mel" video
 Trajetórias de Regina Vater - dissertação PGEHA-USP Talita Trizoli 

1943 births
Living people
Artists from Austin, Texas
American multimedia artists
American photographers
American women installation artists
American installation artists
American women video artists
American video artists
Brazilian emigrants to the United States
Brazilian contemporary artists
21st-century American women photographers
21st-century American photographers
Visual poets